Edwin Cooper may refer to:

 Eddie Cooper (cricketer) (1915–1968), English cricketer
 Edwin Cooper (architect) (1874–1942), English architect
 Edwin Cooper (artist) (1785–1833), English artist